Hotel E is a 1992 Estonian animated film directed by Priit Pärn.

Plot

Cast
Gita Ränk as Alice 
Arne Sirel as Ben 
Timo Viljakainen as Donald
Egon Nuter as George
Kaie Mihkelson as Jane 
Osmo Miettinen as John
Ulna Nõmm as Julia
Maria Avdjuško as Mary
Aivar Kuusk as Robert

Accolades
Awards:
 1992: Trickfilm - Stuttgart Festival of Animated Film (Germany), Baden-Württemburg award
 2004 Melbourne International Animation Festival (Australia), participation
 2014: Cinema Jove - Valencia International Film Festival (Spain), Luna de Valencia Award: Priit Pärn

References

External links
 
 Hotell E, entry in Estonian Film Database (EFIS)

1992 films
Estonian animated films
1992 animated films